Trinity Church is a historic Episcopal church located at Beaverdam, Hanover County, Virginia. It was built in 1830, and is a one-story, gable roofed brick building in an Early Classical Revival style.  The front facade features a small pedimented porch supported on turned wood columns.

It was listed on the National Register of Historic Places in 1990.

References

Churches on the National Register of Historic Places in Virginia
Episcopal churches in Virginia
Neoclassical architecture in Virginia
Churches completed in 1830
Churches in Hanover County, Virginia
National Register of Historic Places in Hanover County, Virginia
19th-century Episcopal church buildings
1830 establishments in Virginia